Spreul is a surname. Notable people with the surname include:

 John Spreul (apothecary) (1646–1722), in the 17th century in Glasgow
 John Spreul (town clerk) (1616–1690), town clerk in Glasgow